KIU Academy is an international, bilingual Christian school located in Kyōtanabe, Kyoto, Japan. The school's goal is to provide students with a safe, nurturing, and academically challenging environment so that they can become people of academic and moral excellence, capable of making a positive influence in the world around them.

Location
The campus is strategically located in Kyotanabe City which is 30 minutes away from three major locations; Kyoto City, The Osaka-Kobe Metropolitan Area, and Nara City.

History
KIU Academy was founded in 1999 by the parent organization Kyoto International University as a school to provide an international education in both English and Japanese to where the graduates would be bilingual and bi-cultural. Today there are around 240 students representing nearly 20 countries, and diverse faculty of over 20 teaching professionals from 8 different countries.

On March 25, 2011, KIU Academy was accredited by the Association of Christian Schools International (ACSI), an organization whose accreditation is recognized in Japan.

In 2022, the school was accredited by the Western Association of Schools and Colleges (WASC).

References

External links
Official Site in English
Official Site in Japanese

Private schools in Japan
Schools in Kyoto Prefecture
Educational institutions established in 1999
1999 establishments in Japan
High schools in Kyoto Prefecture